Achille Manfredini (13 May 1869–1920) was an Italian architect and engineer, active in the Liberty style or Art Nouveau movement. 

While born in Catanzaro, Calabria, his family hailed from Milan. He graduated from the Politechnic institute of  Milan. His monumental architecture exerted some influence on the futurist architect Antonio Sant'Elia.

Circa 1910, Manfredini developed a controversial project for a 14 story skyscraper planned for the piazza where the former church of San Giovanni in Conca was located. The project was derided by critics as an Americanata. The opinions of skyscraper in central Milan were divided among prominent architects of the time. The project  was supported by Luigi Broggi and opposed by Luca Beltrami. 

He became founder and editor of the trade journal for architecture and engineering Monitore tecnico, which began publication in 1894.

Works in Milan        
 Casa Lancia (1905) demolished in 1939, to allow for the construction of the Palazzo del Banco di Roma
 Casa Vanoni (1907)
 Kursaal Diana (1907)
 Casa Giovini (1909)

References

Bibliography 
 Giorgio Rumi, Enrico Decleva: Milano nell'Italia liberale, 1898-1922, Cariplo 1993 (cassa di Risparmio delle provincie lombarde S.p.A.).

19th-century Italian architects
20th-century Italian architects
Architects from Milan
1869 births
1920 deaths
Art Nouveau architects